Cham Shahi may refer to:

Cham Shahi, Kermanshah
Cham Shahi, Lorestan